Sulawesi tortoise or Forsten's tortoise (Indotestudo forstenii) is a species of tortoise in the family Testudinidae. Is native to sulawesi island, indonesia. 

Forsten's tortoise is one of three tortoise species placed in the genus Indotestudo, the others being the elongated tortoise (I. elongata), and the Travancore tortoise (I. travancorica).

Etymology
The specific name, forstenii, is in honor of Dutch botanist Eltio Alegondas Forsten.

Geographic range
Indotestudo forsteni can be found on Sulawesi Island of Indonesia, and its nearby islands such as Halmahera island. In Sulawesi, it is found in the central and northern parts of the island.

In North Sulawesi, it is found in Mount Boliahutu and around Buol, while in Central Sulawesi, it is found in Santigi, Morowali Reserve, Palu Valley, Kulawi Valley, Bora Village near Gimpu, and along the western border of Lore Lindu National Park.

Taxonomy
Indotestudo travancorica, found in the Western Ghats of India, has been previously considered a synonym of Indotestudo forstenii, but is now treated as a separate species.

Gallery

See also
Sulawesi forest turtle (Leucocephalon yuwonoi ) – another threatened turtle endemic to Sulawesi, Indonesia.

References

Further reading

Boulenger GA (1907). "A new tortoise from Travancore". Journal of the Bombay Natural History Society 17: 560–564.
Iverson, John B.; Spinks, Phillip Q.; Shaffer, H. Bradley; McCord, William P.; Das, Indraneil (2001). "Phylogenetic relationships among the Asian tortoises of the genus Indotestudo (Reptilia: Testudines: Testudinidae)". Hamadryad 26 (2): 271–274.
Pritchard, Peter C.H. (2000). "Indotestudo travancorica. A Valid Species of Tortoise?" Reptile & Amphibian Hobbyist 5 (2): 18–28.
Radhakrishnan C (1998). "Additional record of the travancore tortoise, Indotestudo forstenii (Schlegel & Müller) (Testudinita: Reptilia) in Kerala". Cobra 34 (Oct.-Dec.): 19–20.

External links

http://itgmv1.fzk.de/www/itg/uetz/herp/photos/Indotestudo_forsteni1.jpg
http://studbooks.org

Indotestudo
Reptiles of Indonesia
Reptiles described in 1845